Jay Andrew John Raymond Davies is an English footballer who plays for Green Gully as a midfielder.

References

External links
Profile at UpThePosh! The Peterborough United Database
Jay Davies at vicfootball

1991 births
Living people
English footballers
Association football midfielders
Peterborough United F.C. players
Farnborough F.C. players
Woking F.C. players
St Neots Town F.C. players
Bishop's Stortford F.C. players
Biggleswade Town F.C. players
National League (English football) players
Southern Football League players
Isthmian League players